The 1949 Yugoslav Women's Basketball League is the 5th season of the Yugoslav Women's Basketball League, the highest professional basketball league in Yugoslavia for women's. Championships is played in 1949 in Belgrade and played eight teams. Champion for this season is Crvena zvezda.

Regular season

Group A

Group B

Play Off

External links
 History of league

Yugoslav Women's Basketball League seasons
Women
1949 in women's basketball
basketball